
Gmina Barczewo is an urban-rural gmina (administrative district) in Olsztyn County, Warmian-Masurian Voivodeship, in northern Poland.

Villages
Apart from the town of Barczewo, Gmina Barczewo contains the villages and settlements of Barczewko, Barczewski Dwór, Bark, Bartołty Małe, Bartołty Wielkie, Biedowo, Bogdany, Czerwony Bór, Dąbrówka Mała, Dadaj, Dobrąg, Gaj, Jedzbark, Kaplityny, Kierzbuń, Kierźliny, Klimkowo, Klucznik, Kołaki, Koronowo, Kromerowo, Kronówko, Kronowo, Krupoliny, Lamkówko, Lamkowo, Łapka, Łęgajny, Leszno, Leszno Małe, Maruny, Mokiny, Niedźwiedź, Nikielkowo, Odryty, Orzechówko, Próle, Radosty, Ramsówko, Ramsowo, Rejczuchy, Ruszajny, Rycybałt, Sapunki, Sapuny, Skajboty, Stare Włóki, Studzianek, Szynowo, Tęguty, Tumiany, Wipsowo, Wójtowo, Wrocikowo, Zalesie and Żarek.

Neighbouring gminas
Gmina Barczewo is bordered by the city of Olsztyn and by the gminas of Biskupiec, Dywity, Dźwierzuty, Jeziorany and Purda.

References
Polish official population figures 2006

Barczewo
Olsztyn County

de:Barczewo#Gemeindeübersicht